Rally Scotland was a forest rally held in central Scotland as a round of the Intercontinental Rally Challenge (IRC). The first event was held in 2009 and included stages that were last used over 20 years ago on the RAC Rally.

History

At a press conference in Glasgow on 15 October 2008 it was announced that Scotland would host the final round of the 2009 Intercontinental Rally Challenge and that Rally Scotland had secured a three-year contract with the IRC to host the event. Among those present at the launch was the First Minister of Scotland Alex Salmond, the ex-world champion Robert Reid and Andrew Cowan founder of Mitsubishi Ralliart.

The inaugural event was held between 19–21 November 2009 during some of the wettest weather seen in the UK. The event was won by Guy Wilks in a Škoda Fabia S2000.

For 2010, the rally took place at the earlier dates of 15–17 October with the main service area being moved from Blair Atholl Castle to Perth Airport. Juho Hänninen won the event and also sealed victory in the IRC championship. Eurosport again covered the event live.

In 2011 the rally will again have a new date after the initial slot of 14–16 October was moved a week earlier to 7–9 October. The change is due to a request to ensure that sufficient numbers of volunteers are available to running of the event.

Route and stages
The two-day event used rally stages in Perthshire (day one) and the Trossachs (day two) including some of the most famous stages used in the Scottish Rally Championship and the RAC Rally. They include three of Colin McRae's all time favourites; Craigvinean, Drummond Hill and Errochty and also Loch Ard which was described by Kris Meeke as the best stage in the world. Drummond Hill is also the all-time favourite of ex-rally star and M-Sport owner Malcolm Wilson.

Results

References

 
Scotland